Arjan Schreuder (born 19 January 1972) is a Dutch speed skater. He competed in two events at the 1994 Winter Olympics.

References

External links
 

1972 births
Living people
Dutch male speed skaters
Olympic speed skaters of the Netherlands
Speed skaters at the 1994 Winter Olympics
Sportspeople from Amsterdam